Robert Neal Abberley (22 April 1944 – 8 August 2011) was an English first-class cricketer.  A stalwart county player, he was a right-handed batsman and occasional right arm medium pace bowler.

He was born in Stechford, Birmingham and educated at Saltley Grammar School. He played for his native Warwickshire from 1964 to 1979.

He had a modest batting record (he averaged under 25 as a specialist batsman), and played over 250 times for the "Bears".  He made 3 first-class hundreds, with a best of 117 not out against Essex and scored his only one day hundred, 113 not out, against Hampshire.

He moved into coaching in 1980 after retiring from the game, initially as Warwickshire's Second XI coach and later with a 'roving brief' at all levels in the club.  He was particularly involved in the development of Ian Bell and the England team wore black armbands in his honour during the Test against India at Edgbaston in the days following his death.

Playing career
Abberley made his first-class debut for Warwickshire in 1964 against Cambridge University, scoring a half-century in the drawn match. The following year, he made his County Championship debut against Yorkshire, but was unable to bat due to injury.  In 1966, Abberley struck his first-class century, scoring 117 not out against Essex, the highest first-class score of his career. The 1966 season proved to be Abberley's most prolific in first-class cricket, with 1315 runs scored at an average of 28.58. He toured Pakistan with an Under 25 MCC side in 1966/67, in a squad featuring a number of current and future England stars such as Mike Brearley, Dennis Amiss, Alan Knott and Derek Underwood. Abberley scored 92 and 31 in his only match on this tour, against Central Zone.

References

1944 births
2011 deaths
Warwickshire cricketers
English cricketers
International Cavaliers cricketers
Cricketers from Birmingham, West Midlands
English cricket coaches
People educated at Saltley Grammar School
D. H. Robins' XI cricketers
English cricketers of 1946 to 1968
English cricketers of 1969 to 2000
Marylebone Cricket Club Under-25s cricketers
Marylebone Cricket Club President's XI cricketers